WTVD (channel 11) is a television station licensed to Durham, North Carolina, United States, serving as the ABC outlet for the Research Triangle area. Owned and operated by the network's ABC Owned Television Stations division, it maintains primary studios on Liberty Street in downtown Durham, with additional studios and news bureaus in Raleigh, Chapel Hill and Fayetteville. The station's transmitter is located in Auburn, North Carolina. On-air branding uses ABC 11 as a station identifier, with the call letters taking a secondary role.

History

Early years
In 1952, two rival companies each applied for a construction permit to build a television station in Durham on the city's newly allotted VHF channel 11—Herald-Sun Newspapers (publishers of the Durham Morning Herald and the Durham Sun as well as the owners of radio station WDNC) and Floyd Fletcher and Harmon Duncan, the then-owners of WTIK radio. In December 1953, the two sides agreed to join forces and operate the station under the joint banner Durham Broadcasting Enterprises. Originally christened with the "WTIK-TV" call letters, the station had to make a name change after the partners sold WTIK radio as a condition of the permit grant. Ownership chose WTVD and was granted the change, but they had to wait—the call sign had been used in the 1953 20th Century Fox film Taxi for a fictional television station appearing in the movie. At the time, the Federal Communications Commission (FCC) allowed unassigned call letters to be used in fictional works for an exclusive two-year period, making them unavailable for actual broadcast use.

Ten months after being granted its permit, on September 2, 1954, WTVD began broadcasting with a black-and-white film of "The Star-Spangled Banner", followed by You Bet Your Life. It was originally a primary NBC affiliate, with secondary ABC and CBS affiliations. Channel 11 is the Triangle's oldest surviving television station, having signed on a few months after CBS affiliate WNAO-TV (channel 28). The station's initial studios were located in a former tuberculosis sanitorium at Broad Street in Durham, with a transmitter located atop Signal Hill in northern Durham County.

WRAL-TV (channel 5), based in Raleigh and locally owned by the Capitol Broadcasting Company, debuted in December 1956 and took over as the Triangle's NBC affiliate, leaving channel 11 with only ABC. WNAO-TV ceased operations at the end of 1957 due to financial difficulties, and CBS moved its primary affiliation to WTVD. During the late 1950s, the station was also briefly affiliated with the NTA Film Network.

On May 22, 1957, the station's original owners sold their interest in WTVD to Albany, New York-based Hudson Valley Broadcasting Company, owners of WCDA-TV (now WTEN), to form Capital Cities Television Corporation (predecessor of Capital Cities Communications). Around 1958, WTVD built a  tower at its present transmitter site in Auburn to increase its signal coverage for the entire Raleigh–Durham–Fayetteville market; at the time this was the tallest man-made structure in the U.S. That same year, the station first began broadcasting network programs in color, although it would not be until 1966 before the same was true for local programming.

After WRAL-TV took the ABC affiliation full-time in 1962, WTVD was forced to shoehorn CBS and NBC programming onto its schedule. This was a very unusual arrangement for what was then a two-station market. The Triangle was, at least on paper, big enough even then to support three full network affiliates. However, the only other VHF license in the market, channel 4, had already been taken by National Educational Television outlet WUNC-TV. UHF TV broadcasting was not considered viable at the time. Not only were television manufacturers not required to include UHF tuning capability until 1964, with the passage of the All-Channel Receiver Act in 1961, but the available UHF frequencies were not thought to be nearly strong enough to cover a market that stretched from Chapel Hill in the west to Goldsboro in the east. This situation was similar to that of WAPI-TV (now WVTM-TV) in Birmingham, Alabama. However, unlike WAPI-TV, WTVD managed to find room for The Ed Sullivan Show, the CBS Evening News with Walter Cronkite and The Tonight Show Starring Johnny Carson.

Although the market got a third commercial station six years later when a new channel 28 signed on as WRDU-TV (now WRDC), WTVD continued to "cherry pick" the most popular CBS and NBC programs for another three years, leaving WRDU with the lower-rated shows from both networks as well as NBC's news programming. In 1971 the FCC, intervening on behalf of WRDU's owners and in the interest of protecting the development of UHF, ordered WTVD to select one network. Channel 11 decided to go with CBS full-time, allowing WRDU to become an exclusive NBC station (it is now affiliated with MyNetworkTV).

In 1978, WTVD attempted to expand its broadcast coverage to the Fayetteville area, which had been without a television station of its own for nearly two decades. Its studios were relocated to their current location on Liberty Street in downtown Durham on a parcel of land it shares with the Durham County Library; it also built its current  tower in Auburn. A fire on March 4, 1979 caused extensive damage to the newly built studio building; however, the newsroom and a number of other key components had been rebuilt within a month. By that time, much of WTVD's operations had returned to normal, although it had resorted to temporary setups during the interim such as holding the newscasts in one of the meeting rooms that survived the fire unscathed.

Switch to ABC

On March 18, 1985, WTVD's owner, Capital Cities, announced it was purchasing ABC. Five months later, on August 4, 1985, WTVD traded networks with WRAL-TV and became an ABC affiliate. At that time, WTVD and WRAL-TV joined the small list of stations in the country that have held primary affiliations with all of the "Big Three" networks. The transaction was finalized on January 3, 1986, making WTVD an ABC owned-and-operated station, the first network-owned television station in North Carolina. In 1996, The Walt Disney Company acquired Capital Cities/ABC.

On the night of December 6, 1991, a helicopter carrying a pilot and three WTVD employees from a high school football game in Wilmington, North Carolina crashed when an engine bearing seized, killing three of the four people on board. Sports reporter Tony Debo, the only survivor, suffered a broken ankle; he was thrown free of the crash when his improperly installed seatbelt failed. The National Transportation Safety Board report published a year later cited the pilot's decision to continue the flight despite a known engine problem.

On April 30, 2000, a dispute between Disney and Time Warner Cable forced WTVD off cable systems within the Raleigh–Durham–Fayetteville market for over 24 hours during the May sweeps period. Other ABC stations in markets served by Time Warner Cable, such as New York City, Los Angeles and Houston, were also affected by the outage as well before the FCC forced TWC to restore service to those areas on May 2. In July 2010, Disney announced that it was involved in another carriage dispute with Time Warner Cable which involved four ABC owned-and-operated stations (including WTVD), Disney Channel and the networks of ESPN. If a deal was not in place, the entire Disney cluster would have been removed from Time Warner and Bright House cable systems across the country. On September 2, 2010, Disney and Time Warner Cable reached a long-term agreement to keep the Disney family of channels on its systems.

Programming
Like most ABC O&O stations, WTVD has preempted World News Now. Syndication programming currently broadcast on WTVD includes Tamron Hall, Wheel of Fortune, Jeopardy!, Rachael Ray, Wipeout and Live with Kelly and Ryan (produced by sister station WABC-TV).

WTVD airs select college football games from the North Carolina Tar Heels, the Duke Blue Devils and the NC State Wolfpack through ESPN College Football on ABC. As a then-CBS affiliate, WTVD aired the Wolfpack men's basketball team's upset of the Houston Cougars in the 1983 NCAA Division I Men's Basketball Championship Game.

News operation
WTVD presently broadcasts 43 hours of locally produced newscasts each week (with 6½ hours each weekday, 4½ hours on Saturdays and six hours on Sundays); in regards to the number of hours devoted to news programming, it is the highest local newscast output of any television station in the Research Triangle market. For most of the last four decades, WTVD has been a solid second in ratings across the market, behind WRAL. This is in contrast to most of its ABC stablemates (including former Capital Cities sisters WPVI-TV in Philadelphia and KFSN-TV in Fresno, California), which dominate their markets' news ratings. However, WTVD is still one of the strongest ABC stations in the country.

As with ABC's other owned-and-operated stations, WTVD features forecasts provided by AccuWeather for the weather segments of its newscasts. It operates its own weather radar, called "First Alert Doppler XP", at its transmitter site in Auburn. In addition to its main studios, the station operates bureaus in Fayetteville on Green Street and Raleigh on Fayetteville Street. WTVD has a fleet of regular news vans and trucks as well as a yellow Toyota FJ Cruiser which carries the name "Breaking News One". WTVD also has a helicopter for newsgathering, which it refers to as "Chopper 11 HD". WTVD has also began to implement a drone for newsgathering, which it dubs as "Drone 11"..

Principal anchor Larry Stogner began working with station in 1976, and served as weeknight anchor from 1982 to 2015. On January 23, he announced his retirement after being diagnosed with amyotrophic lateral sclerosis; ultimately passing away on October 3, 2016. His co-anchor for much of the 1980s and 1990s, Miriam Thomas, abruptly left WTVD after nineteen years in November 2001. Notable former members of WTVD's news staff include musicians John Tesh and John D. Loudermilk, as well as former Good Morning America co-host David Hartman, ESPN personality Stuart Scott, and Nightline host Byron Pitts.

From 1973 to 1984, WTVD used the Eyewitness News brand for its newscasts, though its format was very similar to the Action News format pioneered by sister station WPVI-TV in Philadelphia. The arrangement was similar to those used at WKBW-TV in Buffalo, New York and KFSN-TV. For a time, all three stations used the same theme song, "Move Closer to Your World," and a nearly identical opening sequence. WRAL was also using the Action News brand during that time period. It called its newscasts simply WTVD 11 News from 1984 to 1993. WTVD called itself NewsChannel 11 from 1993 to 2000, when it changed back to Eyewitness News. WTVD was among the last stations to use the Cool Hand Luke Tar Sequence theme in its broadcasts (which was also used on WRAL for a period in the 1970s). However, the station debuted the theme soon after the Capital Cities/ABC merger and retired it in 1993. Like sister stations WABC, KABC, and KGO-TV, the theme was used only in the opens.

On June 26, 2006, WTVD debuted a new primetime newscast for WB (now CW) affiliate WLFL (channel 22) entitled Eyewitness News at 10 on WB 22. This happened after WLFL's owner, Sinclair Broadcast Group, ended the controversial News Central format on its stations and shut down WLFL's established in-house news department. This newscast ran directly against the WRAL-produced 10 p.m. newscast on WRAZ (channel 50). On September 17, concurrent with WLFL's affiliation switch to The CW, the newscast changed its name to reflect its new affiliation. On April 21, 2008, WTVD became the second television station in the Triangle behind WRAL and the eighth ABC-owned station to begin broadcasting its local newscasts in high definition. The primetime news on WLFL was included in the upgrade. WTVD debuted an hour-long 4 p.m. newscast on May 26, 2011 to fill the void left by The Oprah Winfrey Show, whose long run in that time slot came to an end a day earlier.

On June 27, 2022, it was announced on WLFL's social media accounts that WTVD would no longer produce newscasts for WLFL and a full hour and a half of The National Desk will fill the 10 p.m. to 11:30 p.m. time slot on WLFL, leaving once again WRAZ as the only local station showing news at 10 p.m.

Notable former on-air staff
 Rich Brenner – sports anchor and reporter (deceased)
 Liz Horton – meteorologist
 Byron Pitts – journalist and host of ABC's Nightline
 Stuart Scott – later an anchor on ESPN's SportsCenter (deceased)
 John Tesh – later of Entertainment Tonight

Technical information

Subchannels
The station's digital signal is multiplexed:

Analog-to-digital conversion
WTVD discontinued regular programming on its analog signal, over VHF channel 11, at 12:30 p.m. on June 12, 2009, the official date in which full-power television stations in the United States transitioned from analog to digital broadcasts under federal mandate. The station's digital signal relocated from its pre-transition UHF channel 52, which was among the high band UHF channels (52–69) that were removed from broadcasting use as a result of the transition, to its analog-era VHF channel 11. On September 23, 2009, the station filed an application to the FCC to increase its effective radiated power from 20.7 to 45 kilowatts. Effective June 30, 2020, under the provisions of the FCC's spectrum reallocation program, WTVD's transmissions moved to channel 9, while continuing to display channel 11 as its virtual channel.

Out-of-market cable and satellite carriage
In recent years, WTVD has been carried on cable in multiple areas outside of the Raleigh–Durham–Fayetteville media market. That includes cable systems within the Greensboro, Greenville, Myrtle Beach, and Wilmington markets in North Carolina, and the Roanoke market in Virginia. On DirecTV, WTVD has been carried in Alamance County, which is within the Greensboro market.

In the 1970s and 1980s through CATV, WTVD was once carried as far east as Wilmington and as far west as Mount Airy. WTVD was also carried on cable in Brunswick County, Greenville, Williamston, Emporia, Virginia, and Bennettsville, South Carolina.

References

External links
 

ABC network affiliates
This TV affiliates
ABC Owned Television Stations
Television channels and stations established in 1954
1954 establishments in North Carolina
TVD